Metaphatus is a genus of moths in the family Palaephatidae. It was described by Donald R. Davis in 1986.

Species
 Metaphatus spatulatus Davis, 1986
 Metaphatus ochraceus Davis, 1986
 Metaphatus ichnius Davis, 1986
 Metaphatus cirrhus Davis, 1986
 Metaphatus sinuatus Davis, 1986
 Metaphatus adustus Davis, 1986

References

Palaephatidae
Monotrysia genera